Bir Singh Mahato (14 September 1945 – 17 April 2021) was an Indian politician and an MP representing the Purulia (Lok Sabha constituency) in West Bengal. As member of All India Forward Bloc, he was member of 10th, 11th, 12th, 13th Lok Sabha.

He was sentenced to ten years rigorous imprisonment by a Purulia local court for a rape case in 1983.
The Calcutta High Court acquitted Bir Singh Mahato, a former Forward Bloc MP from Purulia, in the rape case.

Mahato died on 17 April 2021, aged 75.

References

Sources
http://archive.indianexpress.com/news/hc-acquits-former-bloc-mp-in-rape-case/532205/
http://indianexpress.com/tag/bir-singh-mahato-rape-case/

External links
 Official biographical sketch in Parliament of India website

1945 births
2021 deaths
All India Forward Bloc politicians
People from Purulia district
India MPs 1991–1996
India MPs 2004–2009
Lok Sabha members from West Bengal
India MPs 1996–1997
India MPs 1998–1999
India MPs 1999–2004
Indian people convicted of rape
Indian politicians convicted of crimes